The Subcommittee on Immigration Integrity, Security and Enforcement is a standing subcommittee within the United States House Committee on the Judiciary. It was previously known as the Subcommittee on Immigration and Citizenship.

Jurisdiction 
Immigration and naturalization, border security and drug interdiction, admission of refugees, treaties, conventions and international agreements, claims against the United States, private immigration and claims bills, and non-border enforcement.

 Members, 118th Congress

Historical membership rosters

116th Congress

115th Congress

References

External links 
 Subcommittee page

Judiciary House Immigration